Pavilion Theatre or Pavilion Theater may refer to:

United Kingdom
Pavilion Theatre (Glasgow), Scotland
Pavilion Theatre, Bournemouth, part of the Bournemouth International Centre complex, England
 Pavilion Theatre, Brighton, former name of Studio Theatre (Brighton)
Pavilion Theatre, Cromer Pier, a seaside theatre on Norfolk, England
Pavilion Theatre (Rhyl), a theatre in Rhyl, Wales
Pavilion Theatre, Torquay (1912–1976), an historic theatre in Torquay, Devon
Pavilion Theatre, Whitechapel, an historic theatre

Other countries
Chatham Garden Theatre or Pavilion Theatre, a playhouse in the Chatham Gardens of New York City
 Pavilion Theater, a former movie theater in New York City now run as one of two Nitehawk Cinemas
 Pavilion Theatre, Adelaide, former name of a cinema more well-known as the Rex Theatre in Adelaide, Australia
Pavilion Theatre (Dún Laoghaire), a theatre in Dún Laoghaire, Ireland

See also
London Pavilion, a music hall until 1923
Pavilion (disambiguation)
Weymouth Pavilion, a theatre at Weymouth, Southern England